Håmmålsfjellet (historically also called Hummelfjell) is a mountain located on the border of the municipalities of Tolga and Os in Innlandet county, Norway. It is the 495th-tallest peak in Norway.

This mountain was the site of the crash of Braathens SAFE Flight 253 on 7 November 1956.

See also
List of mountains of Norway

References

Mountains of Innlandet
Tolga, Norway
Os, Innlandet